The Hacker Crackdown: Law and Disorder on the Electronic Frontier is a work of nonfiction by Bruce Sterling first published in 1992.

The book discusses watershed events in the hacker subculture in the early 1990s. The most notable topic covered is Operation Sundevil and the events surrounding the 1987–1990 war on the Legion of Doom network: the raid on Steve Jackson Games, the trial of "Knight Lightning" (one of the original journalists of Phrack), and the subsequent formation of the Electronic Frontier Foundation. The book also profiles the likes of "Emmanuel Goldstein" (publisher of 2600: The Hacker Quarterly), the former assistant attorney general of Arizona Gail Thackeray, FLETC instructor Carlton Fitzpatrick, Mitch Kapor, and John Perry Barlow.

In 1994, Sterling released the book for the Internet with a new afterword.

Historical perspective
Though published in 1992, and released as a freeware, electronic book in 1994, the book offers a unique and colorful portrait of the nature of "cyberspace" in the early 1990s, and the nature of "computer crime" at that time. The events that Sterling discusses occur on the cusp of the mass popularity of the Internet, which arguably achieved critical mass in late 1994. It also encapsulates a moment in the information age revolution when "cyberspace" morphed from the realm of telephone modems and BBS' into the Internet and the World Wide Web.

Critical reception
Cory Doctorow, who voiced an unabridged podcast of the book, said it "inspired me politically, artistically and socially".

Quotations

References

External links

Editions of the book in English 
 Plain-text version from Project Gutenberg
 Rich-text version in HTML, EPUB, and Markdown formats
 Feedbooks.com version with a table of contents
 HTML-formatted version hosted at MIT
 eBooks@Adelaide  (University of Adelaide)

Translations and other formats 

 Czech translation of The Hacker Crackdown
 Audiobook of The Hacker Crackdown

Computer security books
Phreaking
Non-fiction Cyberpunk media
1992 non-fiction books
Books about computer hacking
Works about computer hacking